Yélamos may refer to:

Yélamos de Abajo, municipality located in the province of Guadalajara, Castile-La Mancha, Spain
Yélamos de Arriba, municipality located in the province of Guadalajara, Castile-La Mancha, Spain